Marypat Farrell (born June 23, 1972, in Norwich, Vermont) is an American actress and musician best known for her role on The Gavin Crawford Show, and as a performer (under the stage name Ryan O'Neill) with the Celtic punk band The Mighty Regis. She plays Kitty Robinson on the video podcast Goodnight Burbank, and has had guest roles in television series including Ben and Kate, Criminal Minds, 90210, Conan, Suburgatory, Gavin Crawford's Wild West, Curb Your Enthusiasm and Anger Management.

She is an alumna of The Second City's Toronto company.

References

External links

Living people
American television actresses
1972 births
Actresses from Vermont
People from Norwich, Vermont
Canadian Comedy Award winners